Yelena Nikolayevna Kuznetsova (born August 4, 1977 in Almaty) is a female race walker from Kazakhstan. She set her personal best in the women's 20 km (1:32.23) on March 31, 2000 in Almaty.

Achievements

External links

sports-reference

1977 births
Living people
Kazakhstani female racewalkers
Athletes (track and field) at the 2000 Summer Olympics
Athletes (track and field) at the 2004 Summer Olympics
Olympic athletes of Kazakhstan
Sportspeople from Almaty